Al-Oruba Means unity or belonging:

Sports

Football 
 Al-Oruba FC, Saudi Arabian football club
 Al-Oruba (Zabid), Yemen football club
 Al-Orouba SC, Oman football club
 Al-Oruba SC, defunct Qatari football club
 Al-Oruba SC (Iraq), Iraqi football club
 Ouroube SC, Syrian football club
 Al Urouba (Ajelat), Libyan football club
 Al Urooba, Emirati football club